Bryngwyn Halt railway station is a disused station that was on the Llanfyllin Branch of the Cambrian Railways. It served the villages of Bwlch-y-cibau and Brynderwen between 1863 and 1965.

History
The Llanfyllin Branch of the Cambrian Railways opened on 17 July 1863. The station was originally named Brongwyn; it was later renamed Bryngwyn. In 1866, there was one train on Tuesdays and one on Wednesdays. Originally provided with a wooden shelter, this was later replaced by one of corrugated iron. The platform was situated on an embankment on the west side of the Llanfechain road over bridge with step access to the road.

In 1923, the Great Western Railway renamed the station Bryngwyn Halt. It was closed by British Railways on 18 January 1965. No trace remains today.

References

External links
Bryngwyn Halt on navigable 1948 O.S. map

Disused railway stations in Powys
Former Cambrian Railway stations
Railway stations in Great Britain opened in 1863
Railway stations in Great Britain closed in 1965
Beeching closures in Wales